Feek is a surname. Notable people with the surname include:

Florence Feek (1876–1940), English suffragette and Post Office worker
Greg Feek (born 1975), New Zealand rugby union player
Heidi Feek (born 1986), American singer and songwriter
Joey Feek (1975–2016), American country music singer and songwriter
Rory Feek (born 1965), American country music singer and songwriter

English-language surnames